Windsor railway station is located on the Sandringham line in Victoria, Australia. It serves the south-eastern Melbourne suburb of Windsor, and opened on 19 December 1859 as Chapel Street. It was renamed Windsor on 1 January 1867.

The station is listed on the Victorian Heritage Register.

History

Link to St Kilda
The station was the terminus for services on the Brighton Beach line, which opened in 1859, and operated by the St Kilda and Brighton Railway Company. The company also built the loop branch line, connecting the Brighton line to the Melbourne – St Kilda line, which opened in 1857.

Services from Melbourne travelled to the St Kilda terminus, and then "backed out" onto the loop line to Windsor. The loop ran on timber trestles across the swampy ground now known as Albert Park Lake, and included a raised embankment, with a bridge over St Kilda Road. On 3 December 1859, the first train on the loop ran, with the line opening to the public ten days later. There were no trains after 7pm on the branch line, so passengers had to walk from St Kilda to their homes in Prahran.

A short time after the loop line was constructed, a direct connection was built between South Yarra and Windsor, with the first train arriving at Windsor directly from Melbourne on 24 November 1860. As a consequence, the loop line to St Kilda fell into disuse, and track duplication, a condition of the original crown lease, was never completed.

Sidings
The St Kilda and Brighton Railway Company experienced financial difficulties and, in 1862, was bought by the Melbourne and Suburban Railway Company. The track, bridge and trestles between St Kilda and Punt Road were dismantled, but a short section was retained as a siding at Windsor. Due to the track alignments, there were two level crossings within 100 metres on Union Street, because the siding continued to be used for shunting trains from the Brighton line, and to carry screenings from the Richmond quarries to a commercial depot on Punt Road (then known as Hoddle Street).

Perversely, it was due to local annoyance at the siding level crossing near the station that trains won the legal right-of-way at road-rail intersections in Victoria. Indignant at the delays to horse-drawn traffic caused by trains, and in particular the perpetually closed and unmanned crossing at the siding, local councillors from Prahran marched to the level crossing in question one morning in 1869, with a group of workers who began to rip up the tracks on the siding. On 17 April of that year, the matter was brought to court and, although the railways won the right-of-way case, the siding was not reconstructed.

No evidence of the bridge over St Kilda Road or the embankments remain, although the alignment of the loop can be traced by the residual parkland and some oddly-shaped property boundaries. A small park to the west of Windsor is called "Windsor Siding".

1887 accident
On the evening of 11 May 1887, an express train collided into the rear of a stopping all stations train between Prahran and Windsor. Four people were killed and over 100 severely injured. The all stations train had been halted short of Windsor by a signal. When the signal to proceed was given, the driver could not release the brakes on his train due to a ruptured air pipe. An express train from Melbourne was scheduled 10 minutes behind the stopping train and, due to a curve in the track and a deep cutting, the crew of the express could not see the stationary train ahead. Cooper (1924) reported that the noise of the impact could be heard throughout Prahran and that, in a short time, over 10,000 people were gathered at the site. The driver of the Brighton express, Frederick William Maskell, was killed, along with his fireman, James Houston McNab, William Runting, aged 21, and Annie Foster, aged 45, of Colac. Only weeks earlier, Maskell had received a special reward of £5 from the Railways Commissioners for his alertness in averting an accident after another driver had disregarded a signal.

20th century
In February 1972, the overhead wiring above No. 1 road was removed.

The goods yard existed at the up end of the station, until its closure in December 1977.

During 1979, a crossover and connections to the former goods yard were spiked out of use, and a number of dwarf signals were abolished. In October of that year, automatic semaphore signals were replaced with light signals between Windsor and Prahran.

In 1983, boom barriers replaced interlocked gates at the Union Street level crossing, located at the up end of the station. The signal box for the level crossing was also abolished during this time.

21st century
On 4 May 2010, as part of the 2010/2011 State Budget, $83.7 million was allocated to upgrade Windsor to a Premium Station, along with nineteen others. However, in March 2011, this was scrapped by the Baillieu Government.

Platforms and services
Windsor has two side platforms. It is served by Sandringham line trains.

Platform 1:
  all stations services to Flinders Street

Platform 2:
  all stations services to Sandringham

Transport links
Yarra Trams operates three routes via Windsor station:
 : Melbourne University – Malvern
 : Melbourne University – East Brighton
 : North Richmond – Balaclava

Gallery

References

External links
 Melway map at street-directory.com.au

Heritage-listed buildings in Melbourne
Listed railway stations in Australia
Railway stations in Australia opened in 1859
Railway stations in Melbourne
Railway stations in the City of Stonnington